The first Cricket World Cup was played in England on six different venues. A total of 15 matches were played in 1975 Cricket World Cup including 2 Semifinals and a Final match.

Umpires
Out of the 8 selected umpires, 7 of them belong to the England while Bill Alley was from Australia.
The first semifinal was supervised by Bill Alley and David Constant while Lloyd Budd and Arthur Fagg supervised the second semifinal.

Dickie Bird and Tom Spencer were elected to stand in the final of first ever played Cricket World Cup.

References

External links
 Cricket World Cup 1975 from Cricinfo

Officials

mr:१९७५ क्रिकेट विश्वचषक बाद फेरी